The Glenfiddich Piping and Fiddle Championships are musical competitions for the bagpipes and fiddle.  Both competitions take place annually in late autumn, at the ballroom of Blair Castle at Blair Atholl in Perthshire, Scotland.   Entry to each championship is by invitation only, to those who have won various recognised major UK solo competitions held throughout the year.

The Glenfiddich Piping Championship
The Glenfiddich Piping Championship was established in 1974 to inspire and stimulate individual pipers, and to seek the best overall exponents of the Ceòl Mór or piobaireachd (the great music) and Ceòl Beag (the little music).

The championship was founded and continues to be run by William Grant & Sons., distillers of Glenfiddich and other whiskies.

Ten of the leading pipers in the world, all of whom will have won important awards since the previous October, are invited. Each of them submits a list of six piobaireachd, and is required to play one of them.  They also submit lists of six marches, strathspeys and reels, and play one of each,  twice through.

There are prizes in each discipline, and an overall championship prize.

2012 Championship
The Glenfiddich Piping Championship 2012 was won by Iain Speirs of Edinburgh.

Other 2012 finalists included returning champion Roddy MacLeod M.B.E. of Glasgow, Callum Beaumont of Bo'ness, Murray Henderson from Kirriemuir, Finlay Johnston from Glasgow, William McCallum from Bearsden, Stuart Liddell of Inveraray, Euan MacCrimmon of Isle of Skye, Gordon Walker of Ayr and Canadian-based piper Jack Lee from Surrey, a suburb of Vancouver.

Previous championships
Previous Glenfiddich Piping Championship Winners from the last 49 years:

2022 Willie McCallum, Campletown - 9th Win 
2021 Jack Lee, Canada - 3rd Win, Willie McCallum sets new record of 10th MSR win
2020 Stuart Liddell, Inveraray - 3rd Win
2019 Finlay Johnston - 2nd Win
2018 Finlay Johnston
2017 Jack Lee, Canada - 2nd Win
2016 Roddy MacLeod, Glasgow - 5th Win, record-breaking 10th Piobaireachd win, Willie McCallum sets record 8th MSR Win
2015 Angus MacColl, Benderloch - 4th Win
2014 Stuart Liddell, Inveraray- 2nd Win
2013 Iain Speirs, Edinburgh - 2nd Win
2012 Iain Speirs, Edinburgh
2011 Roddy MacLeod, Glasgow - 4th Win
2010 Angus MacColl, Benderloch - 3rd Win
2009 Stuart Liddell, Inveraray
2008 Gordon Walker, Galston - 2nd Win
2007 Gordon Walker, Galston
2006 Angus MacColl, Benderloch - 2nd Win
2005 Willie McCallum, Glasgow - 8th Win (Willie McCallum wins both individual events)
2004 Willie McCallum, Glasgow - 7th Win (Willie McCallum wins both individual events)
2003 Jack Lee, Canada - 1st piper from North America to win 
2002 Roderick J. MacLeod, Cumbernauld - 3rd Win
2001 Willie McCallum, Glasgow - 6th Win
2000 Willie McCallum, Glasgow - 5th Win
1999 Willie McCallum, Glasgow - 4th Win
1998 PM Alasdair Gillies, Pittsburgh - 3rd Win
1997 Roderick J. MacLeod, Cumbernauld - 2nd Win
1996 PM Alasdair Gillies, Pittsburgh - 2nd Win
1995 Angus MacColl, Oban
1994 Willie McCallum, Glasgow - 3rd Win
1993 Willie McCallum, Glasgow - 2nd Win
1992 Roderick J. MacLeod, Cumbernauld
1991 PS Alasdair Gillies, Queen's Own Highlanders
1990 Willie McCallum, Glasgow
1989 Murray Henderson - 4th Win (Murray Henderson wins both individual events)
1988 P/M Gavin Stoddart - 2nd Win
1987 Murray Henderson - 3rd Win
1986 Iain MacFadyen - 4th Win
1985 Murray Henderson - 2nd Win
1984 Iain MacFadyen - 3rd Win
1983 P/M Gavin Stoddart (P/M Gavin Stoddart wins both individual events)
1982 P/M Angus MacDonald - 2nd Win (P/M Angus MacDonald wins both individual events)
1981 Iain MacFadyen - 2nd Win
1980 P/M Iain Morrison
1979 Murray Henderson
1978 Hugh MacCallum
1977 Iain MacFadyen
1976 P/M Angus MacDonald
1975 P/M John Burgess
1974 James McIntosh

The Glenfiddich Fiddle Championship

The Glenfiddich Fiddle Championship was added in 1989 to the existing Glenfiddich Piping Championships – to reward, encourage and perpetuate the art of fiddle playing throughout the world.

Eight finalists are hand selected to compete following successes throughout the year, with each finalist giving a recital incorporating all the various styles of composition including a set of tunes by a specific composer – a new composer is chosen annually.

2015 Championship

The Glenfiddich Fiddle Championship 2015 was won by George Davidson of Tarves in Aberdeenshire.
Second place went to Maggie Adamson of Fladdabister, Shetland, and third place went to Mari Black of Boston, Massachusetts, USA.

2014 Championship

The Glenfiddich Fiddle Championship 2014 was won by Mari Black of Boston, Massachusetts, USA.
Second place went to George Davidson of Tarves in Aberdeenshire, and third place went to Maura Shawn Scanlin of Boone, North Carolina, USA.

2012 Championship

The Glenfiddich Fiddle Championship 2012 was won by Maggie Adamson from Shetland.
Second place went to Erin Smith of Aberdeen, and third place went to Ronald Jappy of Findochty.

Previous championships
Glenfiddich Fiddle Championships winners:
2015 George Davidson
2014 Mari Black
2013 Maura Shawn Scanlin
2012 Maggie Adamson
2011 Maggie Adamson
2010 Nicola Auchnie
2009 Rebecca Lomnicky
2008 Raemond Jappy
2007 Calum Pasqua
2006 Gemma Donald
2005 Sarah Naylor
2004 Ross Thomson
2003 Stephen Cordiner
2002 Ruaridh Campbell
2001 Gillian Risi
2000 Gillian Risi
1999 Patsy Reid
1998 Patsy Reid
1997 Russell Kostulin
1996 Russell Kostulin
1995 Paul Anderson
1994 Keith Anderson
1993 Kathryn Nicoll
1992 Maureen Turnbull
1991 Maureen Turnbull
1990 Maureen Turnbull

References

External links
Glenfiddich Piping Championships
Glenfiddich Fiddle Championships

Music competitions in the United Kingdom
Folk festivals in Scotland
Piping events